Kings Grove is an extinct town in Holt County, in the U.S. state of Missouri.

Kings Grove was laid out ca. 1850 by John B. King, and named for him. A post office called Kings Grove was established in 1875, and remained in operation until 1881.

References

Ghost towns in Missouri
Former populated places in Holt County, Missouri